A by-election was held for the New South Wales Legislative Assembly electorate of Wentworth on 23 January 1882 because of the resignation of William Brodribb to accept an appointment to the Legislative Council.

Dates

Result

William Brodribb resigned to accept an appointment to the Legislative Council.

See also
Electoral results for the district of Wentworth
List of New South Wales state by-elections

References

1882 elections in Australia
New South Wales state by-elections
1880s in New South Wales